Stephen Jones may refer to:

In business
Stephen Jones (milliner) (born 1957), British milliner
Stephen Jones (attorney) (born 1940), American attorney and activist

In the arts
Stephen Jones (editor) (1763–1827), English magazine editor
Stephen Oscar Jones (1880–1967), American composer (Poppy)
Stephen Jones (musician) (born 1951), Australian music and video artist
Stephen Jones (author) (born 1953), British editor and author
Stephen Jones (Babybird) (born 1962), British musician and novelist
Stephen Graham Jones (born 1972), American author

In sport
Stephen Jones (American football) (born 1964), American executive
Stephen Jones (Canadian football) (born 1960), Canadian football player
Stephen Jones (cricketer) (born 1955), South African cricketer
Stephen Jones (hurdler) (born 1978), Barbadian Olympic hurdler
Stephen Jones (journalist), British journalist
Stephen Jones (rower) (born 1993), New Zealand rower
Stephen Jones (rugby union) (born 1977), Welsh rugby union player

Others
Stephen Jones (Australian politician) (born 1965), Australian politician
Stephen Jones (administrator) (born 1969), President of Bob Jones University
Stephen Jones (Wisconsin politician), American politician
Stephen Christopher Jones (born 1958), Virginia politician
Stephen F. Jones (born 1952), American academic
Stephen Francis Jones (born 1961), American architect
Stephen M. Jones (born 1960), American professor of music composition at Brigham Young University
Stephen Jones, defense attorney of Timothy McVeigh

See also
Steve Jones (disambiguation)
USS Stephen R. Jones (ID-4526), a cargo ship that served in the United States Navy, 1918–1919
Staff Jones (born 1959), Wales and British Lions rugby union player

Jones, Stephen